Prothalotia lehmanni, common name Lehmann's top shell, is a species of sea snail, a marine gastropod mollusk in the family Trochidae, the top snails.

Description
The Prothalotia lehmanni shares the corneous operculum shell specific to the Trochidae family, and has the common nacreous interior. On the small side, Lehmann's top snail ranges from 10mm to 17mm in size.

Distribution
This marine species is endemic to Australia and occurs off South Australia and Western Australia.

References

 Lamarck, J.B. 1822. Histoire naturelle des Animaux sans Vertèbres. Paris : J.B. Lamarck Vol. 7 711 pp.
 Cotton, B.C. 1959. South Australian Mollusca. Archaeogastropoda. Handbook of the Flora and Fauna of South Australia. Adelaide : South Australian Government Printer 449 pp. [119] (118, fig. 57 as Prothalotia ramburi (Crosse) 119, fig. 58 as Prothalotia lesueuri (Fischer); 120, fig. 59 
 Macpherson, J.H. & Gabriel, C.J. 1962. Marine Molluscs of Victoria. Melbourne : Melbourne University Press & National Museum of Victoria 475 pp.

External links
 To Barcode of Life (1 barcode)
 To GenBank (5 nucleotides; 1 proteins)
 To USNM Invertebrate Zoology Mollusca Collection
 To World Register of Marine Species
 

lehmanni
Gastropods described in 1843